Plum Branch may refer to:

Plum Branch, South Carolina, a town in McCormick County
Plum Branch (Back Creek), a stream in Missouri
Plum Branch (Clear Fork Blackwater River), a stream in Missouri
Plum Branch (Miami Creek), a stream in Missouri
Plum Branch (North Fork Fabius River), a stream in Missouri

See also
Plumb Branch